KSRA-FM (92.7 FM) is a radio station  broadcasting a country music/adult music hybrid format. Licensed to Salmon, Idaho, United States. The station is currently owned by Emily and Robert Goodrich, through licensee Bitterroot Communications, Inc. It features programming from Cumulus Media Networks.

Studios for KSRA AM-FM are located at 315 Riverfront in Salmon. Both transmitters are at the joint transmitter site, northeast of town, off North St. Charles Road.

History
KSRA-FM, signed on in 1979. The station's AM sister station, KSRA signed on in 1959 and was owned by David and Elizabeth Ainsworth. They sold the station in 1969. Current owners James and Cindy Hone purchased the station in 2000 from Wescomm, Inc. The Hones' Salmon River Communications sold both stations to Bitterroot Communications, Inc. effective January 4, 2019 for $350,000.

References

External links
KSRA-FM website

SRA-FM
Mainstream adult contemporary radio stations in the United States
Radio stations established in 1979
1979 establishments in Idaho